Aleksandar Kirovski (born 25 December 1990) is a Serbian retired footballer, who played as a goalkeeper.

Club career
Kirovski started his career with Zemun in the 2008–09 season. He was first choice goalkeeper for three seasons, making near 100 official appearances for the club. Kirovski then spent two seasons at Red Star Belgrade, before returning to Zemun in the summer of 2013. Kirovski was elected for the best goalkeeper in the 2016–17 Serbian First League season, by Serbian newspaper Sportski žurnal. On 22 June 2017, Kirovski signed a two-year deal with Čukarički. After a season with Čukarički, Kirovski mutually terminated the contract and left the club following the end of the 2017–18 Serbian SuperLiga campaign. On 20 June, Kirovski was promoted as a new player of Vardar by the sporting director, Darko Pančev. In December 2018, Kirovski terminated the contract with and left Vardar as a free agent, missing to make any official appearance for the club.

On 5 February 2019, Kirovski joined FK Budućnost Dobanovci. After a short spell at OFK Žarkovo, Kirovski returned to Budućnost Dobanovci in January 2020, before retiring four months later at the age of 30, in May 2020, after his fifth back surgery.

International career
Kirovski represented Serbia at the 2009 UEFA Under-19 Championship. He made his debut for the Serbian national under-21 team in a friendly match against the Bulgarian national under-21 team on 25 March 2011, a 4–1 home win. His second cap came in a 2–0 home friendly win over Moldova U21 on 14 August 2012.

Notes and references

External links
 UEFA profile
 
 Srbijafudbal profile

1990 births
Living people
Association football goalkeepers
Serbian footballers
FK Zemun players
FK Čukarički players
Red Star Belgrade footballers
FK Vardar players
FK Budućnost Dobanovci players
OFK Žarkovo players
Serbia youth international footballers
Serbia under-21 international footballers
Serbian First League players
Serbian SuperLiga players
Footballers from Belgrade
Serbian expatriate footballers
Serbian expatriate sportspeople in North Macedonia
Expatriate footballers in North Macedonia
Serbian people of Macedonian descent